Babies On Board is a Chinese television drama that airs on the Singaporean television channel Mediacorp Channel 8 on weeknights. The show aired at 9pm on weekdays and had a repeat telecast at 8am the following day. It stars Tay Ping Hui, Jesseca Liu and Ya Hui as the casts of this series.

Cast

Main cast

Sun (Zhihui)'s family

Li (Xinyue)'s family

Huang (Lifeng)'s family

Other cast members

Cameo appearances

Original soundtrack (OST)

Awards & Nominations 
Babies On Board is up for 2 nominations.

It did not win any nominations.

Star Awards 2019

Trivia
The finale episode was aired on TV for 50 minutes including advertisements instead of 1 hour due to SPOP Sing: Fun With SPOP Sing.

See also
 List of programmes broadcast by Mediacorp Channel 8

References

Mediacorp Chinese language programmes
Singapore Chinese dramas
2018 Singaporean television series debuts
Channel 8 (Singapore) original programming